Albert Wentworth Demaree (September 8, 1884 – April 30, 1962) was an American professional baseball pitcher, who played in Major League Baseball (MLB) for the New York Giants, Philadelphia Phillies, Chicago Cubs, and Boston Braves, from 1912 to 1919.

Demaree posted an 80-72 won-loss record with a 2.77 earned run average (ERA), with 514 strikeouts, and 15 shutouts, in 1,424 innings pitched. Although a weak hitter, posting a .118 batting average (54-for-456), he was an above fielding pitcher, recording a .980 fielding percentage, committing only 7 errors in 352 total chances.

External links

Al Demaree at SABR (Baseball BioProject)

1884 births
1962 deaths
Major League Baseball pitchers
New York Giants (NL) players
Philadelphia Phillies players
Chicago Cubs players
Boston Braves players
Columbus Discoverers players
Savannah Indians players
Chattanooga Lookouts players
Hopkinsville Hoppers players
Mobile Sea Gulls players
Seattle Rainiers players
Portland Beavers players
Columbus Senators players
Portland Beavers managers
Baseball players from Illinois
Sportspeople from Quincy, Illinois
Kewanee Boilermakers players